Dr. Augusto Caraceni is a former Italian racing driver. He entered four races between 1951 and 1958. Caraceni was the son of Domenico Caraceni, founder of Caraceni, a Rome-based tailor whose clientele included Humphrey Bogart and Aristotle Onassis. He was named after his uncle, Augusto Caraceni, who opened the Paris branch of the Caraceni tailors.

Results

References

External links
Racing Sports Cars profile

Italian racing drivers
Mille Miglia drivers